John Campbell of Stackpole Court and Cawdor (1695–1777), was a British politician. He was a Member of Parliament (MP) for Pembrokeshire, Nairnshire, Inverness Burghs and Corfe Castle.

He was born the second son of Sir Alexander Campbell, MP in the Scottish Parliament, and his wife Elizabeth, daughter of Sir John Lort, 2nd Baronet, of Stackpole Court, Pembrokeshire. He was educated at Lincoln's Inn (1708) and Clare College, Cambridge (1711) and succeeded his mother to the Stackpole estate in 1714 and his grandfather Sir Hugh Campbell to estates in Nairnshire (Cawdor), Inverness-shire, and Argyll in 1716. Stackpole Court became the family home.

He was elected Member of Parliament (MP) for Pembrokeshire in 1727, sitting until 1747. He afterwards represented Nairnshire from 1747 to 1754, Inverness Burghs from 1754 to 1761 and Corfe Castle from 1762 to 1768.

He was also the Lord Commissioner of the Admiralty (1736–42) and Lord Commissioner of the Treasury (1746–54).

He died in 1777. In 1726 he had married Mary, the daughter and coheiress of Lewis Pryse, of Gogerddan, Cardiganshire, and had three sons and three daughters.

References

Oxford Dictionary of National Biography, Campbell family of Cawdor (per. 1511–1821), highland chiefs, landowners, and politicians by Andrew Mackillop, Jean Munro, and R. W. Munro.

|-

|-

1695 births
1777 deaths
Alumni of Clare College, Cambridge
Members of Lincoln's Inn
Members of the Parliament of Great Britain for Welsh constituencies
Members of the Parliament of Great Britain for Scottish constituencies
Members of the Parliament of Great Britain for English constituencies
British MPs 1727–1734
British MPs 1734–1741
British MPs 1741–1747
British MPs 1747–1754
British MPs 1754–1761
British MPs 1761–1768
Lords of the Admiralty